Medication was an American rock band that included Logan Mader, Whitfield Crane, B. Blunt, Kyle Sanders and Roy Mayorga. They released a self-titled EP and an album titled Prince Valium through Locomotive Music, and filmed a video for the song "Inside". Before the recording of Prince Valium, Mayorga parted ways from the group to rejoin Soulfly for the recording of 3. He was replaced by Chris Hamilton. They played one show in Los Angeles with nu metal band Strain 999 at The Whisky on Sunset with Robert Trujillo, now of Metallica, on bass. They disbanded in 2003 due to the cancelation of their European tour and the US branch of their record label closing.

Band members
Whitfield Crane (Ugly Kid Joe, Another Animal) – vocals
Logan Mader (Machine Head, Soulfly) – guitar, vocals, producer
B. Blunt – guitar
Kyle Sanders (Piece Dogs, MonstrO, Hellyeah) – bass
Roy Mayorga (Stone Sour, Soulfly, Hellyeah) – drums

Discography

EPs
Medication (2002)

Studio albums
Prince Valium (2002)

References

Hard rock musical groups from California
Heavy metal musical groups from California
Musical groups disestablished in 2003
Locomotive Music artists